Ballynahinch Olympic Football Club is a Northern Irish, intermediate football club based in Ballynahinch, County Down, playing its matches at Kilmore Playing Fields, Crossgar. They play in the Premier Division of the Northern Amateur Football League. Club colours are Claret and Blue.

History

Ballynahinch Olympic was formed in 1973 as a community based club to cater for the increased demand for soccer in the Ballynahinch area. Some of the founding members include Brendan McAllister, Brian Sloan, Sean Murnin, Jim Dornan and Barney Brown.

The idea came initially from Barney Brown in a work tea hut and it grew from there through the first training session and into the game. That first ever game was against a Plessey team and not surprisingly Olympic were beaten easily. The first pitch was in Magheralone and the first strip ever worn was red and white stripes. It was donated by a team in Belfast that were in the process of changing their strip.

Newcastle League (1973-2009)

The first club silverware was won only 3 seasons after its formation when the team won the Newcastle League Division 2 in the 1976/77 season. The increasing interest in football and the club made it an easy decision to start up a 2nds team who completed their first season during 1977/78. In this season the 1st team, now in Division 1 went right through the season undefeated.

As the club continued to thrive, new faces were attracted and one in particular, Tom Potter, was to become the new driving force in the club over a 12-year period between 1978 and 1990. During Potter's reign the 1st team won the double of the Division 2 title and the Harry Clarke Cup. They also started up their youth sections which have been the key to the clubs success over many years.

The 1991–92 season was another milestone year for the club, under the stewardship of Norman McCullough, the team reached the semi-finals of the Harry Clarke Cup and several months later failed at the final hurdle in the prestigious Junior Shield, losing to Kelvin Old Boys at Ballyskeagh. The club did manage to win some silverware that season though, the 2nd team managed by Eamon (Mouse) Wilson won the Binian Cup after a marathon penalty shoot-out. This was the first of a number of wins in this competition for the 2nd team.

In the winter of 1994 a young player named Mark Quinn who had progressed through the ranks of our youth teams and was at this time a regular in the first team squad died in tragic circumstances. It was his family's wish that he be buried wearing his Olympic No 11 shirt. Because of this, the club approached the Newcastle League committee asking that we retire the No 11 shirt in memory of Mark. This request was approved by the said committee.

One of the local competitions which the club participated in remained elusive, namely the Bobby Dalzell Cup. This situation was addressed in the 1997/98 season when, after several postponements, the First team captured the trophy by defeating Kilkeel in the final. At this time Damien Travers was in charge of the 1st team.

At the end of the 2001/02 season the 1st team were relegated from the Premier Division. Into the hotseat came arguably the most successful management team the club ever had. Initially it was Paul (Charlie) Sloan and Francie McGoran and after the 2002/03 season they were joined by Steven Ward, three ex-players whose enthusiasm for the club never faltered even during many a lean year. The 2002/03 season seen the team go right through the league campaign winning every game. They finished the season as Division 1 champions, gaining promotion and winning the Purdy Cup along the way. Not satisfied with this, Sloan and Ward set about repeating the feat in the Premier Division. Many a dissenting voice at the start of the 2003/04 season reckoned the team would struggle to compete at the higher level. This was most certainly not the case and the team managed to go on and win the Premier Division title with games to spare. It is not often that a team retained the Premier League title, but in 2004/05 season, Olympic did so. Not only that, but the team also got to the final of both the Bobby Dalzell and Harry Clarke Cup competitions. They missed out on the Dalzell Cup, losing on penalty kicks to Castlewellan, but exacted some revenge by defeating Castlewellan in the Harry Clarke Cup final, scoring the winning goal with virtually the last kick of the game, making it another double winning season.

Although up to this point little has been said about the clubs 2nds team (and for the short time it existed, the 3rds team) but along with the youth teams they were the breeding ground for talent and ensured the ongoing success of the club.

Amateur League (2009-present)

The season of 2009/10 showed a new chapter for the club's history, their acceptance into the Northern Amateur Football League. After five years of trying with ill effect, their wishes were granted, with a step into Division 2C. The first league game was away to St.Theresa which ended in a 3–3 draw. Although, the club's first ever game in Amateur League football was in the Cochrane Crory Cup against Immaculata, going down 5–3. During this exciting period the club started to rise through the leagues with the return of managers Paul Sloan and Steven Ward in 2011/12 season, winning Division 2B in spectacular fashion clinching the title away to their local rivals Temple Rangers FC.

After promotion into intermediate football, season 2012/13 (Division 1C), playing their home games at Bellsbridge, ground sharing with Dromara Village F.C., the club proved again that it was a rising force in local football, narrowly missing out on league victory, but gaining promotion into Division 1B.

Niall (Minto) Murray took charge of the 1st team for the 2015/16 season in a player-manager role and guided his side to the top of the table, winning their first 10 games of the league campaign. Murray's stint as manager ended soon after though, resigning from his position to concentrate on his playing career and other commitments. His assistants Barry Reid and Martin Hughes stepped into the hotseat for the remainder of the season and the team never faltered. In the end, they won the Division 1B title by 12 points from second placed Newcastle FC.
The 2nds team continued to make giant strides under the leadership of long-standing chairman and manager Martin Sloan and former player John Molloy. After being promoted to the Newcastle League Premier Division for the first time, they secured a mid-table finish and made it to the Junior Shield last 16, to cap another good season for the senior teams. 
That same season saw the formation of an U17 team which competed in the Downpatrick Youth League (DYFL). The team finished second in Section B and made it to the League Cup Semi-final under manager Barry McGoran.

Following promotion to Division 1A the club appointed Liam Sloan as manager alongside Barry Reid. Sloan had been heavily involved the club's recent success as a player and Reid, another former player himself agreed to continue in his role following the previous season's impressive league title win. The team met their aim of consolidation, eventually finishing eighth in a league won by East Belfast FC. They also reached the Semi-final of the Clarence Cup for the first time in their history, narrowly losing 2–1 to 1st Bangor FC at Seaview. 
In the same season, the 2nds team were relegated from the Newcastle League Premier Division (NADAFL) after two years in the top flight. 
The club also entered an U18 team into the South Belfast Youth League (SBYL) for the first time. The team, managed by Barry McGoran, had a good season, finishing third in their league.
It was a tough year for the club and the U18 team in particular following the devastating and tragic death of the highly rated and hugely popular Matthew Davis. The 18 year-old had only recently joined the club but had such an impact on his team-mates and peers that the SBYL renamed one of their cup competitions, The Matty Davis Cup, in his memory.

In the 2017/18 season, Sloan and Reid set a clear objective of achieving promotion, something both men were no strangers to. After a flawless start to the season, the team went on to achieve promotion and won the Division 1A League title on goal difference from second placed Islandmagee FC. The team only lost two league games all season and completed their meteoric rise to the NAFL Premier Division for the first time. 
The 2nds team also saw a rapid change in fortunes following relegation to the NADAFL Division 1. Barry McGoran and Martin Sloan were appointed managers and despite falling just short of promotion (fourth place), they managed to reach the Bobby Dalzell Cup final after a 3–2 victory AET against Premier Division side Celtic Bhoys. The team went on to lose the final at Meadowvale, Drumaness, 3–1 against eventual treble winners Ballyvea FC.
In the same season, due to an increased demand in the club and the youth team players integrating into the senior teams, the club decided to form a 3rds team. Simon Walsh and Martin Hughes took the reins and the team finished in a very respectable fifth position in the NADAFL Division 2.

Following promotion as champions and the club getting a pitch passed to meet intermediate standard, the 2018/19 season was their first ever in the NAFL Premier Division. It meant the club had climbed seven divisions in ten years. An achievement largely attributed to the continuity and ambition of the club on and off the pitch. 
Olympic finished fourth in the league, just three points behind second place and the club reached its first ever Border Cup final, beating Orangefield OB 2–1 at Seaview in the Semi-final, but losing out to Crumlin Star on penalties after leading 1–0 with two minutes of normal time remaining. Olympic also reached the Clarence Cup Semi-final for the second time but lost 3–2 to Rosemount Rec.
The 2nds team were thriving too, winning their first ten league games of the season, achieving their aim of promotion to the NADAFL Premier Division as champions, edging out local rivals Ballynahinch YM. They also reached the Bobby Dalzell Cup final for the second consecutive season after a tense Semi-final against Ballynahinch YM which ended 0-0 AET. Olympic ran out winners on penalties. But they struggled to land a blow in the final, losing 4–0 to Celtic Bhoys.
Brian McCaffrey was appointed 3rds team manager and guided a young side to a comfortable mid-table finish to round off another good season for the club.

The same management team's remained in place for the 2019/20 season and the club continued to progress. They won their first 12 league games and yet again reached the Border Cup final after beating Shankill Utd 2–1 in the Semi-final. On the same night the club's 2nds team beat Mourne Rovers 4–3 in the Bobby Dalzell Cup Semi-final. Incredibly, it meant that for the second year in a row the club had reached the same two cup finals, which were due to be played within one week of each other, over the Christmas period. In fact, it would be the third consecutive Bobby Dalzell Cup final for the 2nds team.
This time the 1st team faced Rathfriland Rangers in the final at Seaview. The game ended 2-2 AET which resulted in a tense penalty shootout with Olympic holding their nerve to claim a dramatic 7–6 victory and lift the Border Cup for the first time in their history. Olympic were top of the league when the season was abruptly cut short in March 2020 due to the Coronavirus Pandemic.
The 2nds were in a mid-table position in their first season back in the Premier League when the season came to a halt and they had to endure the pain of their Bobby Dalzell Cup final being declared null and void. The original Boxing Day 2019 fixture was postponed due to a waterlogged pitch at Drumaness FC's home ground, Meadowvale, where the game was traditionally played. It was rearranged for St.Patrick's Day 2020 but the Coronavirus Pandemic meant it was postponed for a second time. After several more attempts to play the game over a nine-month period, it was eventually agreed that the competition be declared null and void.

The club has a successful youth setup with age groups ranging from U6 - U17 and continues to run its own Saturday Morning Youth League under the stewardship of Stevie Ward.

Honours

Managerial timeline

Club Committee

Notes

External links
 Official website  

Association football clubs in Northern Ireland
Northern Amateur Football League clubs
Association football clubs in County Down